Trustix Secure Linux was a Linux distribution intended for use on servers and focused on security and stability. It was a hardened and secure OS, meaning that non-essential services and binaries are not installed, while UNIX staples like Sendmail are replaced by programs like Postfix.

Trustix was originally produced by Trustix AS. The company was established late in 1997 by entrepreneurs from the United States and Norway. The company went bankrupt in 2003 and Comodo Group bought the assets in November 2003. Shortly thereafter Comodo announced the end of the free version of Trustix Secure Linux. Not long thereafter Comodo changed their minds and the free version reappeared.

By late 2005 a series of budget cuts had resulted in many of the developers being laid off, and by early 2006 all members of the original Trustix team had left the company. Trustix Secure Linux continues to be maintained by a very small team of developers in India.

By late 2007 Comodo announced that it will discontinue all distribution, updates and direct support for Trustix Secure Linux effective December 31, 2007.

External links

Trustix Secure Linux at DistroWatch.com

Discontinued Linux distributions
RPM-based Linux distributions
Gateway/routing/firewall distribution
Linux distributions